The Ages of Lulu is a 1990 Spanish erotic drama film written and directed by Bigas Luna and starring Francesca Neri, Óscar Ladoire, María Barranco and Javier Bardem. It is based on the novel of the same name by Almudena Grandes. The film is about the title character's life and sexual awakening in Madrid, which leads to her involvement in increasingly dangerous sexual experimentation.

Plot 
The fifteen-year-old Lulú is seduced by Pablo, her brother Marcelo's best friend, who then leaves to work in the United States.  Lulú is sustained for years by the belief that Pablo will come back into her life.  When he returns he proposes to her and they are married.  Pablo and Lulú have a passionate relationship, developing a taste for sexual games.

On one nocturnal expedition they join up with a transgender prostitute called Ely who becomes their friend.  The couple have a daughter, Ines.  Pablo convinces Lulú to participate blindfolded in a threesome; when Lulú discovers that the third person was Marcelo, her brother, she leaves Pablo in disgust, taking their daughter with her.  However, her own desire to play increasingly dangerous sex games now comes to consume her.

After becoming aroused watching a gay porn movie, she seeks out gay men and pays them to join in orgies, or watch them having sex.  Unable to pay enough to satisfy her desires, she meets a pimp called Remy who runs a secret S&M club.  Ely tries to warn Lulú that Remy is dangerous, but Lulú ignores her, so Ely goes to warn Pablo.  Remy tells Lulú to go to a club, where she is tied up by Jimmy, a gay man she had previously paid for sex.

She is forced to endure violent sex while gagged and bound.  Ely tells Pablo that Lulú is in danger.  She goes to the club to rescue her, but is attacked by Jimmy and killed when her head hits a metal bar.  Pablo calls the police, who arrest Jimmy and the others.  Lulú and Pablo are reunited.

Cast

Production 
The film is an adaptation of the international best-selling novel with the same name written by Almudena Grandes. Ángela Molina, who was originally cast in the lead role, withdrew when she learned how explicit the sex scenes were to be.

Javier Bardem has a small, uncredited role as a corrupt gay man, one of his first roles on screen.

Neri is dubbed into Spanish by another actress.

In an interview, Bigas Luna recalled the episode when Francesca Neri, due to script requirements, was forced to shave her pubes and burst into tears before shooting one of the film's most scabrous scenes. He had to go and cheer her up and Neri, says Bigas Luna, "opened her bathrobe and shot her sex in my eyes and said to me, crying: 'Bigas, I'm sick, I look ugly, hideous'".

Cuts in UK version 
The film was cut in the UK by two minutes and 55 seconds by the BBFC. These cuts include an S&M orgy at a gay club being shortened, a man sexually touching Lulu and a sex scene; these scenes were restored for the 2002 DVD release. In addition to these cuts an opening scene in which Lulu is baptised as a baby was cut as the child's genitalia is exposed to camera; this shot is considered to be in breach of the Protection of Children Act 1978. The 2002 UK DVD required 1:15 cuts for baptism scene; a new title sequence was used instead.

Reception 

The Ages of Lulu was listed on Film4's 50 Sexiest Film Moments.

María Barranco won the Goya Award as Best Supporting Actress for her role as a transsexual prostitute.

Home Media 
The Ages of Lulu was released on DVD by Umbrella Entertainment in December 2011. The DVD is compatible with region code 4.

References

External links 
 

1990s Spanish-language films
Spanish erotic drama films
1990 films
1990 LGBT-related films
1990s erotic drama films
Madrid in fiction
Incest in film
Spanish LGBT-related films
Films featuring a Best Supporting Actress Goya Award-winning performance
Films directed by Bigas Luna
Films about trans women
LGBT-related drama films
1990 drama films
Films based on Spanish novels
1990s Spanish films